"That's the Way of the World" is a song recorded by the band Earth, Wind & Fire, released as a single in June 1975 on Columbia Records. The song reached No. 5 on the Billboard Hot Soul Singles chart and No. 12 on the Billboard Hot 100.

Overview
The song is the title track of Earth, Wind & Fire's 1975 album That's the Way of the World. The track was produced by bandleader Maurice White, who also wrote the song along with Charles Stepney and Verdine White.

Critical reception
Cash Box said that it was "clean, mindbending and soulful."  George Chesterton of The Guardian noted that the song is "touched with the epic, which emerges as the scope of its message of hope and soulful majesty unfold." Alex Henderson of Allmusic called the song "unforgettable". Stephen Curwood of the Boston Globe wrote "The title cut comes into your consciousness the way a cool air-conditioned breeze rushes over your face when you've been out in the sticky heat. Sometimes the cool goes too dry for our taste, but then, that's a form of sophistication." Daryl Easlea of the BBC also said That's the Way of the World "remains irresistible: six minutes of ethereal, bossa nova-influenced soul."

Chart history

Accolades
The information regarding accolades attributed to "That's the Way of the World" is adapted from rollingstone.com and acclaimedmusic.net.

(*) designates lists that are unordered.

References

1974 songs
1975 singles
Earth, Wind & Fire songs
Funk ballads
Rhythm and blues ballads
Songs written by Verdine White
Songs written by Maurice White
Columbia Records singles
1970s ballads
Songs written by Charles Stepney